"Things Goin' On" is a song by American rock band Lynyrd Skynyrd, written in 1973 by vocalist Ronnie Van Zant and guitarist Gary Rossington. David Blackfoot helped record and play guitar. It appeared on the band's first album (Pronounced 'Lĕh-'nérd 'Skin-'nérd) and expressed concerns about social and environmental issues, with especial criticism of politicians' roles in such issues. The song was distinct from other contemporary protest songs in that it utilized the sound of Muscle Shoals and Alabama blues licks made popular by both Eric Clapton and Duane Allman in his honky tonk melodies, though this was in keeping with Lynyrd Skynyrd's country-rock image.

Composition 
The first verse, which expressed concern about life in the ghetto is repeated at the end of the song, thereby placing emphasis on this particular issue.  It also contains the line that gives the song its title:

Well, have you ever lived down in the ghetto?Have you ever felt that cold wind blow?Well, if you don't know what I mean
Won't you stand up and scream
Cause there's things going on that you don't know

The first line of the song is particularly pertinent in that it asks the listener whether he has ever lived down in the ghetto; support for segregation was still widespread in the southern United States at the time and Lynyrd Skynyrd risked alienating a large number of potential fans before the group became an established act.

The thinly veiled criticism of politicians' responsibility mentioned earlier in the song becomes more evident towards the end of the final verse:
I don't think they really care
I think they just sit up there ...

References

1973 songs
Lynyrd Skynyrd songs
Protest songs
Song recordings produced by Al Kooper
Songs written by Ronnie Van Zant
Songs written by Gary Rossington